Reproductive value is a concept in demography and population genetics that represents the discounted number of future female children that will be born to a female of a specific age. Ronald Fisher first defined reproductive value in his 1930 book The Genetical Theory of Natural Selection where he proposed that future offspring be discounted at the rate of growth of the population; this implies that sexually reproductive value measures the contribution of an individual of a given age to the future growth of the population.

Definition
  = probability of surviving from age 0 to age 
and
  = average number of offspring produced by an individual of age 

In a population with a discrete set of age classes, Fisher's reproductive value is calculated as
 
where  is the long-term population growth rate given by the dominant eigenvalue of the Leslie matrix. When age classes are continuous,
 
where  is the intrinsic rate of increase or Malthusian growth rate.

See also
 Population dynamics
 Euler–Lotka equation
 Leslie matrix
 Senescence

Notes
 Fisher, R. A. 1930. The Genetical Theory of Natural Selection.  Oxford University Press, Oxford.
 Keyfitz, N. and Caswell, H. 2005. Applied Mathematical Demography. Springer, New York. 3rd edition. doi:10.1007/b139042

References

Population genetics
Senescence